John Kenneth Selby (1936 – May 12, 2012) was the founder of Mazzio's Corporation and chairman of the company up to the time of his death. Selby graduated from Northeastern State University in 1958.

References

Northeastern State University alumni
Deaths from lung cancer
American chairpersons of corporations
Pizza chain founders
1936 births
2012 deaths
American food company founders
20th-century American businesspeople